Hi... We're the Miracles is the first album by The Miracles, Motown's first group, released on Motown's Tamla subsidiary label in the summer of 1961. It was the first album released by the Motown Record Corporation. The album features several songs that played an important role in defining The Motown Sound and establishing songwriters Smokey Robinson and Berry Gordy.

The styles of the album tracks vary from the late doo-wop sound of "Who's Lovin' You" (later recorded by The Temptations, the Jackson 5, Terence Trent D'Arby, and En Vogue) and "(You Can) Depend on Me", to the upbeat R&B of "Way Over There". Also featured is a rendition of Motown's first hit single, Barrett Strong's "Money (That's What I Want)". The album's biggest hit was the bluesy "Shop Around", which was released as a single in 1960 and peaked at number 1 on the Billboard R&B singles chart and number 2 on the pop singles chart (No. 1 Pop, Cashbox). "Shop Around" was the first R&B number 1 single for both the Miracles and Motown label. It was also the label's first million-selling hit single and a 2006 Grammy Hall of Fame-inducted song.

Hi... We're the Miracles features the Miracles' classic original lineup (not to be confused with their true original lineup): Smokey Robinson, Ronald White, Bobby Rogers, Pete Moore, Marv Tarplin (mentioned on the back of the album, though not pictured on the front), and Robinson's wife (and Rogers's cousin), Claudette Rogers Robinson.

Release
Hi... We're the Miracles was released on CD by Motown Records in the early 1990s.

Hi... We're the Miracles and four other Miracles albums were re-released as part of the 2009 Motown 50th anniversary limited edition CD release The Miracles-Depend On Me: The Early Albums.

Track listing

Side one
"Who's Lovin' You" (Smokey Robinson) – 3:06
"Depend on Me" (Robinson, Berry Gordy) – 3:08
"Heart Like Mine" (Ronnie White, Robinson) – 2:06
"Shop Around" (Robinson, Gordy) – 2:50
"Won't You Take Me Back" (Robinson, Gordy) – 2:40
"Cause I Love You" (White, Robinson) – 2:25

Side two
"Your Love" (Robinson) – 2:51
"After All" (Robinson) – 2:47
"Way Over There" (Robinson, Gordy) – 2:57
"Money" (Gordy, Janie Bradford) – 3:48
"Don't Leave Me" (Robinson, Gordy, Brian Holland, Robert Bateman) – 2:43

Personnel

The Miracles
Smokey Robinson - lead vocals, background vocals
Ronnie White - lead vocals, background vocals
Claudette Robinson - lead vocals, background vocals
Warren "Pete" Moore - background vocals
Bobby Rogers - background vocals
Marv Tarplin - guitar

Other credits
The Funk Brothers -  additional instrumentation
Berry Gordy -  producer

Cover versions
"Shop Around" has been covered by Captain & Tennille, Don Bryant, The Astronauts, The Spinners, Allusions, and Georgie Fame, among others. "After All" has been covered by The Supremes and The Marvelettes. "Way Over There" has been covered by Edwin Starr, The Temptations, The Marvelettes, The Royal Counts, New Man, and Eddie Adams Jr. "(You Can) Depend on Me" has been covered by The Temptations, The Supremes, Mary Wells and Brenda Holloway. "Who's Loving You has been covered by The Temptations, The Supremes, The Jackson Five, Terence Trent-D'arby, Brenda and The Tabulations, John Farnham, Human Nature, and En Vogue.

References

External links
  Dusty Groove album review 

Amazon.com album reviews- Hi...We're The Miracles

1961 debut albums
The Miracles albums
Tamla Records albums
Albums produced by Berry Gordy
Albums recorded at Hitsville U.S.A.